Pioneer Woman, also known as Joy, Joy (Pioneer Woman), the Laberee Memorial Fountain, Mother/Child and Young Pioneer Woman, is an outdoor 1956 bronze sculpture and drinking fountain by American artist Frederic Littman, located at Council Crest Park in Portland, Oregon.

Description and history
Located at Council Crest Park on Southwest Fairmont Boulevard, Pioneer Woman is a bronze sculpture and drinking fountain designed by Frederic Littman and completed in 1956. It depicts a standing female figure with her hair flying behind her, holding a baby in her outstretched arms. The sculpture measures approximately   x  x  and rests on a triangular granite base which measures approximately  x  x . The base sits in the center of a hexagonal foundation made of concrete and gravel. An inscription on the base reads "Littman"; another, around the sides of the base, reads: This Fountain a Gift / Of Florence and / George P. Laberee".

The work was donated to the City of Portland by Florence and George P. Laberee. Its condition was deemed "treatment needed" by the Smithsonian Institution's "Save Outdoor Sculpture!" program in November 1993. According to Smithsonian, Pioneer Woman is administered by the City of Portland's Bureau of Parks and Recreation.

See also

 1956 in art
 Drinking fountains in the United States
 The Pioneer Mother (Eugene, Oregon)

References

1956 establishments in Oregon
1956 sculptures
Bronze sculptures in Oregon
Drinking fountains in Oregon
Fountains in Portland, Oregon
Monuments and memorials to pioneer women
Outdoor sculptures in Portland, Oregon
Sculptures of children in Oregon
Sculptures of women in Oregon
Southwest Hills, Portland, Oregon
Statues in Portland, Oregon